Meroptera anaimella is a species of snout moth in the genus Meroptera. It was described by André Blanchard and Edward C. Knudson in 1985. It is found in the United States from southern California to Oklahoma and Texas.

References

Moths described in 1985
Phycitinae